Built Like Alaska is an indie rock band from Oakdale, California, USA. Forming shortly after Jackson's return to Oakdale from Humboldt State University in 1996, the band began playing local dives, dumps and police bars as a three-piece outfit. Signing with Grandaddy's Sweat of the Alps label, they released their début full-length, Hopalong, in 2003. They attracted the attention of a larger indie label, Future Farmer, who released album number two, Autumnland, and re-released Hopalong, both in 2005. Also in 2005, the band provided the score for Scott Coffey's film Ellie Parker and spent a good deal of the summer touring the U.S.  In 2011 Built Like Alaska released their 3rd album In Troubled Times... on now defunct Future Farmer (re-released 2019 on Way Grimace Records). 2020 brings the release of a long-awaited 4th record entitled Apartments on Way Grimace Records. After 20 years in the making and many failed attempts at completing the record, it seems that the 11 song album will tell the stories of the residents of a ramshackle apartment complex in which Jackson used to work at as an on site "fix it man".

Discography

Albums and EPs
This Song Will Bury You (2000, self-released)
Hopalong (2003, Sweat of the Alps; 2005, Future Farmer)
Pamphlets and Films EP (2003, self-released)
Autumnland (2005, Sweat of the Alps/Future Farmer)
Don't Mess With X-Mas (2010, self-released)
In Troubled Times (2011, Future Farmer)
The Coldest Carnie's Heart (2019, self-released)
Apartments (January 2020, Way Grimace Records)

Compilation appearances
If You Rearrange the Letters It Spells Satan (1997) (song: "Visions Of Teela")
Sleeping Off Stolen Dreams (2001, Little Echoes) (song: "Ain't No Bridgegroom")
Portraits: 32 Singers, 32 Songs (2010, Off the Air) (song: "Red Eye")

Reviews
 Autumnland in PopMatters
 Autumland in Stylus Magazine
In Troubled Times...  in  The Aquarian

References

Built Like Alaska bio, Future Farmer
Built Like Alaska—Oakdale's Finest, SF Station, August 10, 2007.
Autumnland, Malcolm Sosa, Fresno Famous, February 17, 2005.
 Anthem No. 16

External links

Indie rock musical groups from California